Smyslov (masculine) or Smyslova (feminine) is a Russian surname. Notable people with the surname include:

Vasily Osipovich Smyslov (1881–1943), Russian chess master and the father of Vasily Vasilievich Smyslov
Vasily Vasilyevich Smyslov (1921–2010), Soviet Russian chess grandmaster and World Chess Champion (1957-1958)
Anton Smyslov (born 1979), Russian footballer

See also 
 5413 Smyslov, a main-belt asteroid

Russian-language surnames